Sudthirak Watcharabusaracum (born 2 May 2000) is a Thai swimmer. She competed in the women's 400 metre freestyle event at the 2017 World Aquatics Championships.

References

2000 births
Living people
Sudthirak Watcharabusaracum
Place of birth missing (living people)
Sudthirak Watcharabusaracum
Sudthirak Watcharabusaracum